Rear Admiral George Brown (June 19, 1835 – June 29, 1913) was an officer of the United States Navy who served during the American Civil War.

Biography
Brown was born in Rushville, Indiana, and entered the navy as a midshipman on February 5, 1849.

He especially distinguished himself on the night of February 24, 1863, when, in command of the river gunboat  at Palmyra Island, he defended himself for an hour and a half against four Confederate gunboats. He was wounded and taken prisoner, and his vessel was destroyed. He was held at Libby Prison in Richmond, Virginia until exchanged in May 1863. He commandeered and armed the civilian vessel Union at Marion, Indiana for defense against Morgan's Raiders in July 1863.

After the war, he conveyed the former  to Japan, to which it had been sold.  He also was elected a First Class Companion of the Indiana Commandery of the Military Order of the Loyal Legion of the United States.

He became a captain in April 1877, after being appointed to command the Department of Alaska, and was promoted to rear admiral in September 1893.

In June and July 1891 he was in Chilean waters involved in the Itata Incident which was a diplomatic affair and military incident involving the United States and Chile during the 1891 Chilean Civil War.  The incident concerned an attempted arms shipment by the rebel ship Itata from the U.S. to Chile.  He was accused by opponents of the administration of having gone beyond his public orders to become involved in intrigues with the combatants. Theodore Roosevelt defends Brown from these charges in his book, Campaigns and Controversies.

He commanded the naval forces in the Philippines in 1889–92, and the Norfolk Navy Yard in 1886–90, and again in 1893–97, when he retired.  Two of his sons, George, Jr. and Hugh, became officers in the U.S. Navy.

Personal life
Brown's wife was Kate Morris.

Dates of rank
Midshipman – 5 February 1849
Passed midshipman – 12 June 1855
Master – 16 September 1855
Lieutenant – 2 June 1856
Lieutenant commander – 16 July 1862
Commander – 25 July 1866
Captain – 25 April 1877
Commodore – 4 September 1887
Rear admiral – 27 September 1893
Retired list – 19 June 1897

Notes

References
 
 Roosevelt, Theodore. Campaigns and Controversies. Kessinger Publishing, 2005.
 The Union Army, Vol VII, The Navy, pp. 17–18
 Indiana in the Civil War website, entry for George Brown

1835 births
1913 deaths
People from Indiana
People of Indiana in the American Civil War
Union Navy officers
United States Navy rear admirals (upper half)